S. Lal Shah Bokhari (July 22, 1909 – July 22, 1962) was a British Indian field hockey player who competed in the 1932 Summer Olympics.

In 1932 he was the captain of the India_men's national field hockey team, which won the gold medal at the Los Angeles Olympics. He played two matches as halfback.

He was also part of the  Indian field hockey team which secured gold at the 1928 Amsterdam Olympics.

He was born in Mianwali.  He migrated to Pakistan upon Pakistan's independence from Britain, and served as a diplomat for Pakistan - his last post being Pakistan's ambassador to Iraq.

1932 Olympics
The Indian team, troubled by groupism (Indians vs Anglo-Indians) that surfaced when Lal Shah Bokhari was named captain ahead of Eric Pinniger, arrived in Los Angeles to a rousing greeting.

See also
List of Indian hockey captains in Olympics
Field hockey in India

References

External links
 
 Lal Bokhari's profile at databaseOlympics.com
 Lal Bokhari's profile at Sports Reference.com

1909 births
1959 deaths
Olympic field hockey players of India
Field hockey players at the 1932 Summer Olympics
Indian male field hockey players
Olympic gold medalists for India
Olympic medalists in field hockey
Ambassadors of Pakistan to Iraq
Field hockey players from Faisalabad
Medalists at the 1932 Summer Olympics